The Olean Times Herald is a daily newspaper serving the western Twin Tiers region, based in Olean, New York. The afternoon newspaper, one of the few remaining afternoon papers in the nation, is published by Bradford Publishing and is published six days each week - Monday thru Friday, with a special “Weekend Edition” delivered on Saturday mornings. It does not publish on Memorial Day, Independence Day, Labor Day, Thanksgiving, Christmas and New Year's. It is the flagship of Bradford Publishing's newspaper stable, which includes The Bradford Era (a morning newspaper that mostly serves Pennsylvania), the Salamanca Press (a weekly paper serving Central and Western Cattaraugus County), the Ellicottville Times (a free weekly), and the Fredonia, Gowanda/Silver Creek and Salamanca Pennysavers.

The Thomson Corporation acquired the Olean Times Herald in 1988; they sold the paper, along with 11 other papers, to the American Publishing Company (later Hollinger International) in 1995. Hollinger sold off most of its small papers in 1999, the Olean Times Herald went to Bradford Publishing. Bradford Publishing Co. is now owned by Community Media Group.

In 2017, Bradford Publishing Co. announced that they had reduced five positions at the Olean Times Herald.

In July 2018, the Bradford Publishing papers were placed behind a soft paywall.

References

External links

Buffalo Hockey Beat - the Times Herald's hockey Web site

Daily newspapers published in New York (state)
Cattaraugus County, New York